The Illinois Eye & Ear Infirmary (IEEI) is a center of ophthalmology and otolaryngology research and clinical practice. 

Located in the Illinois Medical District, the Illinois Eye and Ear Infirmary is the major referral center in the Chicago metropolitan area for eye emergencies and the only Level 1 eye trauma center in the region. The General Eye Clinic also serves as the only emergency eye clinic in all of Chicago. The Chicago Curriculum in Ophthalmology (CCO) meets at the Infirmary where all Chicago area ophthalmology residents are invited. The Illinois Eye Review is also held at the Infirmary. The Infirmary is one of the oldest hospitals of its kind in treatment of disorders of the eye, ear, nose, throat, and head/neck. The Infirmary houses the departments of ophthalmology and otolaryngology of the University of Illinois College of Medicine.

LASIK surgery was invented by Gholam A. Peyman, while he served as the Professor of Ophthalmology at the Illinois Eye and Ear Infirmary. The Department of Ophthalmology has a NIH-funded K12 research program, one of only 7 in the United States. There are partnerships with global programs through Dr. Marilyn Miller, including exchange programs with Keio University in Tokyo and the Federal University of São Paulo. Other programs exist with Nigeria, India, Brazil, Thailand, Iran, Philippines, Guatemala, and Nepal. The Millennium Park Eye Center is staffed by faculty affiliated with the Illinois Eye and Ear Infirmary.
Over the past three decades, the ophthalmology department has been a leading recipient of funding from the National Eye Institute (NEI), part of the NIH.

The ophthalmology residency program is one of the most selective programs in the country with well over 600 applicants annually, of whom only 84 are granted interviews for 6 positions. The majority of exposure to refractive surgery during residency, including LASIK and PRK, occurs at the Millennium Park Eye Center. They also spend a rotation at the Jesse Brown VA Medical Center, which is located a few blocks away. Lastly, residents perform as primary or assisting surgeon in all subspecialties including cornea, retina, and pediatric ophthalmology throughout their training and are involved with on call duties.

History

19th Century
The Illinois Eye and Ear Infirmary was founded in May 1858 by a 30-year-old physician named Edward Lorenzo Holmes as the Chicago Charitable Eye and Ear Infirmary, the department predates the UIC College of Medicine.  The Infirmary took up just a single room in a frame building at 60 North Clark Street in Chicago, and the first patient arrived before the room was even ready. That initial year of operation, the Infirmary had 95 eye patient visits. Most of the patients were afflicted with eye infections.

The private organization was registered as an infirmary association, with a slate of officers and 12 trustees. An influential group of physicians and philanthropists guided the association until the state of Illinois took over the Infirmary's operations in 1871. The name then changed to the Illinois Charitable Eye and Ear Infirmary (“Charitable” later was removed from the name because paying patients also were accepted, and in 1874, the name became the Illinois Eye and Ear Infirmary).

The Infirmary was totally destroyed by the Chicago Fire of October 9, 1871.  Temporary quarters were set up at 137 N. Morgan Street; in 1874 a new building was inaugurated at the corner of Peoria and west Adams street, at a cost of over $40,000.

When the University of Illinois College of Medicine's predecessor, the College of Physicians and Surgeons of Chicago, opened in 1882, the Illinois Eye and Ear Infirmary (IEEI) began its long academic affiliation with the University. However, several government officials thwarted efforts for years to bring the Infirmary into the University Hospitals system. Finally in 1943, the IEEI and the University formally agreed to joint operations.

20th Century
In 1939, the Illinois Eye and Ear Infirmary began one of the nation's first glaucoma specialty clinics. In 1965, the Infirmary moved to the University's West Side Medical Campus, to its current location on Taylor Street. The University's Research and Education (R&E) Hospitals still ran a separate ophthalmology service until 1970, when it was merged into the Infirmary's ophthalmology department.

On October 19, 1965, new facilities for the Illinois Eye and Ear Infirmary were formally dedicated by Illinois Governor Otto Kerner, the result of efforts by Ophthalmology department head Peter C. Kronfeld, MD, Otolaryngology department head Francis L. Lederer, MD, and Lester R. Gerber, Superintendent of the Infirmary since 1946.

Morton F. Goldberg, MD, head of ophthalmology from 1970 to 1989, increased full-time faculty from one to 25, added numerous ophthalmic subspecialty clinics and a postresidency fellowship program, and began a residency surgical rotation in Madurai, India. Dr. Gholam A. Peyman pioneered LASIK surgery at this time. During this period, the Lions of Illinois funded $5 million of the $6.8 million cost of building the Lions of Illinois Eye Research Institute—the largest single donation ever given to the department. When the  institute opened in 1985, it was heralded as the most comprehensive eye research center in the Midwest. 

In 1985, The Lions of Illinois Eye Research Institute (LIERI) opened at the University of Illinois Eye and Ear Infirmary through a generous donation from the Lions Clubs of Illinois. The institute is part of the Department of Ophthalmology and Visual Sciences and has research laboratories, offices, computer services, core facilities for machine shop, imaging, tissue culture and molecular biology research, and one of the largest ophthalmology libraries in the country. Research efforts at LIERI are supported by both private and national grant-funding agencies and by the Department of Ophthalmology and Visual Sciences. LIERI also houses patient care facilities in the Edwin and Lois Deicke Eye Center.

While the Department of Otolaryngology-Head and Neck Surgery existed for the better part of a century before 1933, in that year it became a freestanding department for the first time, headed initially by Joseph C. Beck, M.D., then in 1934 by Francis Lederer, M.D., who led the Department for 33 years.  Dr. Beck had been Dr. Lederer's childhood physician and served as his mentor in clinical and administrative matters, as well as a leader in plastic and reconstructive surgery. Dr. Lederer joined the Department in 1922, served as its acting head in 1925, and became board-certified in Otolaryngology-Head and Neck Surgery in 1926.  He contributed greatly to the institution and the field, including for his service during World War II, for which he was recognized by President Harry Truman.  Author of the landmark book Diseases of the Ear, Nose, and Throat, Dr. Lederer was a mentor for many in the program who became leaders in the field, including Eugene Tardy, M.D.

21st Century
Of the 31 Chicago ophthalmologists as Super Doctors, 11 were based at the Illinois Eye and Ear Infirmary. The Illinois Eye and Ear Infirmary is currently chaired by Dr. Mark Rosenblatt, a cornea specialist.

The Infirmary houses some of the world's most renowned ophthalmology faculty: 57 full-time and part-time ophthalmologists, as well as 18 ophthalmology residents, treat more than 60,000 patients and performs over 3,000 eye operations each year. Fellowships in ophthalmology span the following subspecialties: Cornea, Glaucoma, Neuro-ophthalmology, Oculoplastics, Pediatric Ophthalmology and Strabismus, and Vitreoretinal Disease. Research fellowships in artificial Cornea Research, Cornea Neurobiology & Ocular Surface Disease, and Oculoplastic pre-residency are also available.

The Otolaryngology Department, offers services in six subspecialties — Facial Plastic and Reconstructive Surgery, Speech and Voice Care, Sinus & Nasal Allergy, Oncology and Neurology, Cancer of the Head and Neck, and General Otolaryngology — treated nearly 17,000 patients in 2008, the most recent year for which statistics are available, making it one of the busiest programs in the country.

Through generous donations, the Cless Family Ophthalmology Training and Simulation Center was also established recently at the Illinois Eye and Ear Infirmary.

Notable Alumni and Faculty

Department of Ophthalmology & Visual Sciences

David J Apple: responsible for the Miyake-Apple technique. This method of sectioning the cadaver eye was initially developed by Kansatu Miyake and refined by David Apple. The eye is dissected posterior to the posterior lens capsule and the anterior segment is mounted above a camera which allows observation of the IOL in-situ in the capsule from a posterior view: thus as though looking out on the world through the lens and cornea. Using this technique, Apple and his colleagues were able to analyse the performance of IOLs made of different biomaterials and different lens designs.

Eugene R. Folk: founded the "Chicago" school of strabismus, whose ideas competed with and stimulated those of Marshall M. Parks, Arthur Jampolsky, and other prominent strabismologists

Saul Merin: worked for 25 years with the Illinois Eye and Ear Infirmary, specializing in the diagnosis and treatment of retinal and genetic eye diseases. His book Inherited Eye Diseases is now in its second edition.

Marilyn T. Miller: contributions include descriptions of ocular findings in Mobius syndrome, Parry-Romberg syndrome and fetal alcohol syndrome. She described associations of Duane syndrome  with craniofacial abnormalities, as well as dyslexia, thalidomide toxicity, and other first-trimester anomalies. In the 1990s, her study of eye motility problems in people affected by thalidomide contributed to research into the causes of autism. During her long career, Miller became known particularly for her interest in international ophthalmology. Along with administrative and educational work in this area, she has cared for thousands of patients around the world including Nigeria.

Gholam A. Peyman: Dr. Peyman was awarded the first patent for LASIK, recipient of National Medical of Technology and Innovation, the nation's highest honor for technological achievement, bestowed by the President of the United States, President Obama, on America's leading innovators and a Hall of Fame of Ophthalmology and retina surgeon who is also a prolific and successful inventor. A member of National Academy of Inventors, he has been granted over 160 US Patents covering a broad range of novel medical devices, intra-ocular drug delivery, surgical techniques, as well as new methods of diagnosis and treatment.

Maurice Rabb: founder of the Comprehensive Sickle Cell Center at the Illinois Eye and Ear Infirmary with a colleague, after obtaining a grant from the National Institutes of Health. The center was the only one in the country to diagnose and treat sickle-cell eye disease. Rabb also led a research that helped prevent retinal detachment and blindness in sickle-cell patients. Howard Schatz: a prominent American ophthalmologist and photographer whose works are exhibited in prestigious museums and photography galleries internationally and are included in innumerable private collections. Schatz completed his medical degree at The University of Illinois College of Medicine, followed by an internship at Cook County Hospital in Chicago, ophthalmology residency at the Illinois Eye and Ear Infirmary, and fellowship in vitreoretinal diseases at Johns Hopkins Hospital. Schatz has had seventeen monographs published of his photographs. H2O, Schatz's most recent book, published in 2007, is the third in his series of explorations of imagery made on, over and underwater. Schatz first established a following for this uniquely expressionistic underwater imagery in the 1990s with two collections of underwater photography, Water Dance and Pool Light.

William F. Mieler: Former President of the Association for Research in Vision and Ophthalmology (ARVO) and Life Achievement Honor Awardee from the American Board of Ophthalmology (AAO) and served as its director, vice-chair and chair. He is a past president of the Macula Society, which awarded the 2013 J. Donald Gass Medal to him for his outstanding contributions to the study of macular disease. Currently serves as Director of Ocular Oncology Clinic, and Vice Chair of Education. He was formerly the director of the Residency and Vitreoretinal Fellowship at the Illinois Eye and Ear Infirmary.

Mark O.M. Tso: Professor and Founding Chairman of the Department of Ophthalmology & Visual Sciences, The Chinese University of Hong Kong. Much of his early research concerned ocular pathologic findings in retinoblastoma and laser effects on the retina.

Reza Dana: Resident alumnus at the Illinois Eye and Ear Infirmary; Currently serves as the Claes Dohlman Chair in Ophthalmology, Professor of Ophthalmology at Harvard Medical School, and Senior Scientist & W. Clement Stone Scholar at The Schepens Eye Research Institute, as well as the Director, Cornea & Refractive Surgery, Massachusetts Eye & Ear Infirmary, Vice Chairman of Harvard Department of Ophthalmology, and Director of the Harvard Medical School Cornea Center for Excellence.

Jennifer I. Lim: A leading authority on retina and vitreoretinal diseases, having performed more than 6,000 vitreoretinal surgeries and directed more than 50 clinical research studies and trials on age-related macular degeneration, diabetic retinopathy, macular edema and retinal vein occlusion and complex retinal detachments. Her book, Age-Related Macular Degeneration, is in its 3rd Edition and was published 2013.

Department of Otolaryngology-Head and Neck Surgery

The Department has produced a litany of notable researchers, clinicians, and teachers over the years.  They include:

Francis Lederer, M.D.  In addition to his work as the leader of the Department for 33 years, Dr. Lederer was a captain in the U.S. Navy Corps, contributing to military medicine (among the honors he earned was the Navy Commendation for establishing a rehabilitation program for blinded and hearing-impaired patients at Philadelphia's Naval Hospital) and helping secure the EEI's training relationship with the U.S. Veterans Administration, a relationship that continues today.  His 1940s text Diseases of the Ear, Nose, and Throat was a standard teaching text used for many years, and he started the first speech and hearing center in any medical school at the University of Illinois in the years following World War II.

M. Eugene Tardy, M.D.  Preparing to enter residency training at the University of Iowa, he was serving in the U.S. Air Force when he came across Dr. Lederer's book and sought to meet the author. When he finally did meet Dr. Lederer, their three-hour discussion resulted in Dr. Tardy's decision to come to UI, which he joined as a resident in 1964.  Dr. Tardy, a brilliant and pioneering facial plastic surgeon, inspired many patients and residents, and the Department conducts an annual lecture in facial plastic surgery and the humanities in his name.  Dr. Tardy also served as president of the two major groups in the field, the American Academy of Otolaryngology – Head and Neck Surgery and the American Academy of Facial Plastic and Reconstructive Surgery.

Burton J. Soboroff, M.D. Dr. Soboroff, a widely respected head and neck cancer surgeon, served as interim head of the Department 1975-76 and 1977–79.  Dr. Soboroff was widely admired as a clinician and teacher and was instrumental in developing and supporting resident research activities.  Upon his retirement he established a lectureship in Otolaryngology that continues to this day.

Edward L. Applebaum, M.D. chaired the Department for 20 years, from 1979 to 1999, expanding its reach and establishing a permanent full-time faculty that helped take the Department into the 21st Century.  He helped shepherd the growth of cochlear implant services in the Department, now a leading service of its highly regarded Division of Audiology.  He also became the first Francis L. Lederer Professor of Otolaryngology-Head and Neck Surgery.  Dr. Applebaum also brought several clinical innovations to the field through his many inventions, including the Applebaum Incudostapedial Joint Prosthesis, still used in hearing recovery.

Notable Research

The Department has contributed greatly to research and innovation in otolaryngology-head and neck surgery.  Some of its contributions include:
The Holinger-Brubaker Endoscopic Camera – Paul Holinger, M.D., one of three generations of Holingers in the Department's history, developed a revolutionary means of capturing images used to diagnose and document patient conditions with a photographic engineer, Joseph Brubaker.  The camera advanced endoscopic photography not only in otolaryngology and otology, but across many fields of medicine.
Virtual/Three-Dimensional Temporal Bone Imagery –This three-dimensional, virtual reality tool enabled medical students and residents to learn about the middle and inner ear outside of the surgical suite.  Developed by Dr. Edward Applebaum and resident Ted Mason along with University of Illinois Biomedical Visualization staff, this innovation has contributed significantly to otology education and treatment.
The Temporal Bone Laboratory and Virtual Tympanum – Alongside Dr. Applebaum and Mason's innovation, the Department maintains the Galter Temporal Bone Laboratory, one of the best equipped such facilities in medical education.  Further its research and educational goals, nearly 200 images of the tympanum were digitized and developed into an app for the iPad and Apple devices, thanks to the contribution of the late faculty member Richard Buckingham, M.D., in collaboration with current faculty member Miriam Redleaf, M.D.

Innovative Imaging Studies in CT/MRI for the Head and Neck – Galdino Valvassori, M.D. conducted many groundbreaking studies in the use of imaging technologies for diagnosis and treatment.  Dr. Valvassori was known as the “Father of ENT Radiology,” and published three seminal texts:  Radiographic Atlas of the Temporal Bone, Radiology of the Ear, Nose, and Throat, and the Valvassori Textbook of ENT Radiology.

References

External links
 

1858 establishments in Illinois
Healthcare in Chicago
Hospitals established in 1858
Hospitals in Chicago
Otorhinolaryngology organizations
University of Illinois Chicago
Eye hospitals in the United States